Raine's House, sometimes called Raine House, is a Grade II* listed house in Raine Street, Wapping, London E1.  This listing recognises the building's special architectural or historic interest.

History
This structure was built in 1719, and founded as a charity school by Henry Raine (1679–1738),  who had made a large sum of money from selling alcohol. As a devout Christian, he felt that he should be philanthropic, and decided to found a school where poor children could get a free education. This school was built in the neighbourhood where he lived and he named it "the Lower School".  It originally accommodated 50 boys and 50 girls.

In recent years, this building has been used as a community centre, and as offices of the Academy of St. Martin in the Fields.  The original school moved, and is now called the Raine's Foundation School, on Approach Road, Bethnal Green.

Physical features
The building has a baroque front, with giant pilasters.  There is a stone plaque over the door, at the center of the building: "Come in & learn your duty to God & man. 1719".

Two of the window openings on the second floor have pedimented niches.  Those niches were originally occupied by two contemporary figures of a boy and a girl, but they and other original objects from the school were moved when the school moved, and they are still preserved.  The niches are now filled by replicas.

External links
National Archives Records of Raine's Schools Foundation, Arbour Square, Stepney, London E1
"Schools: Raine's Foundation Schools", British History Online

Further reading
Rose, C.M. Raine's Foundation: an East End Charity School 1716–80 (University of Bristol thesis 1985)
Fuller, Tony. Henry Raine, Brewer of Wapping (2001) 
Raine's Prospect 1719–1969 (Raine's Foundation 1969)
Raine's Foundation: Its Origins and History (1914)
Henry Raine and the History of Raine's Schools (edited by Alan Johnson for the Old Raineans, 2004)

References

Grade II* listed buildings in the London Borough of Tower Hamlets
Wapping